Paraletharchus is a genus of eels in the snake eel family Ophichthidae.

Species
There are currently two recognized species in this genus:

 Paraletharchus opercularis (G. S. Myers & Wade, 1941) (Pouched snake-eel)
 Paraletharchus pacificus (R. C. Osburn & Nichols, 1916) (Sailfin eel)

References

Ophichthidae